The American air campaign during the Vietnam War was the largest in military history. The US contribution to this air-war was the largest. Chief of Staff of the United States Air Force Curtis LeMay stated that "we're going to bomb them back into the Stone Age".

Background
On March 2, 1965, following an attack on a U.S. Marine barracks at Pleiku, Operation Flaming Dart and Operation Rolling Thunder commenced. The bombing campaign, which ultimately lasted three years, was intended to force North Vietnam to cease its support for the NLF by threatening to destroy North Vietnam's air defenses and industrial infrastructure. As well, it was aimed at bolstering the morale of the South Vietnamese. Between March 1965 and November 1968, "Rolling Thunder" deluged the north with a million tons of missiles, rockets and bombs. Bombing was not restricted to North Vietnam. Other aerial campaigns, such as Operation Commando Hunt, targeted different parts of the NLF and PAVN infrastructure. These included the Ho Chi Minh Trail, which ran through Laos and Cambodia. The objective of forcing North Vietnam to stop its support for the NLF, however, was never reached.

By the time the United States ended its Southeast Asian bombing campaigns, the total tonnage of ordnance dropped approximately tripled the totals for World War II. The Indochinese bombings amounted to 7,662,000 tons of explosives, compared to 2,150,000 tons in the world conflict.

USAF/USN/VNAF/RLAF aircraft used

The United States Air Force, United States Navy and their South Vietnamese allies, the Vietnamese Air Force, fielded a large array of technologically advanced ground attack and bomber aircraft. These included the Douglas A-1 Skyraider carrier borne propeller driven dive bomber, the Cessna A-37 Dragonfly, the F-100 Super Sabre, the Northrop F-5 Freedom Fighter, Douglas A-4 Skyhawk carrier borne light attack plane, Grumman A-6 Intruder carrier borne all weather medium bomber and Ling-Temco-Vought A-7 Corsair II carrier borne ground attack plane; the General Dynamics F-111 Aardvark Fighter/Bomber, the Boeing B-52 Stratofortress heavy bomber, Martin B-57 Canberra medium bombers and the English Electric/GAF Canberra B.20 medium bomber.

The North American T-28 Trojan was extensively used by the Vietnamese Air Force and the Royal Lao Air Force for close air support and other bombing missions. Upon occasion, the Lockheed C-130 Hercules was used to drop M-121 bombs that were too large to be carried by smaller aircraft. The North American Rockwell OV-10 Bronco reconnaissance craft could also be used for bombing.

This vast variety of ground attack aircraft used a large number of bombs.

List of bombs

conventional bombs
 Mk-81
 CBU-55
 Mk-77
 Mk-82
 Mk-82 HDGP
 Mk-82 500 LB Bomb
 Mk-83
 Mk-84
 Mk-15
 Mk-20 Rockeye (CBU-100 Cluster Bomb)
 Mk-22
 Mk-38
 Mk-65
 Mk-117
 Mk-118
 BLU-82 Daisy cutter
 M-121

Guided bombs

 AGM-62 Walleye
 BLU-3 Pineapple
 BLU-18
 BLU-17/B
 BLU-26/B
 BLU-24/B
 BLU-36/B
 BLU-66/B
 BLU-59/B
 BLU-61A/B
 BLU-63/B
 BLU-77/B
 BLU-24/B
 BLU-85/B
 BLU-86/B
 BOLT-117
 GBU-10
 GBU-11
 GBU-12 Paveway II
 GBU-27 Paveway III
 GBU-37 Sanslot

Fuel Air Explosives

 BLU-72 Pave Pat I
 BLU-76 Pave Pat II
 BLU-118

See also 

 Weapons of the Vietnam War
 Aircraft losses of the Vietnam War

References 
Printed sources:

 Clodfelter, Micheal Vietnam in Military Statistics: A History of the Indochina Wars, 1792—1991, 1995 
 Frankum, R. B. Like Rolling Thunder: The Air War in Vietnam, 1964–1975, 2005 
 World Book, Inc. (ed.) The World Book Encyclopedia, 2000 

Websites:

 PBS Weapons of the Vietnam War retrieved November 11, 2007

Notes 

Bombs
Vietnam War
Cold War aerial bombs of the United States
Vietnam War-related lists